Kiara Liz Ortega Delgado (born August 23, 1993) is a Puerto Rican dancer and beauty pageant titleholder who was crowned Miss Universe Puerto Rico 2018. She represented Puerto Rico at the Miss Universe 2018 pageant held in Bangkok, Thailand. She finished in the Top 5 at Miss Universe 2018.

Personal life
Ortega was born in San Juan, Puerto Rico. She works for an organization named Centro Inés which provides different educational, recreational and support services for children and seniors to help develop a sense of independence, creativity, and mastery of skills.

Pageantry 
On 20 September 2018, Ortega began her pageantry career representing Rincón in the Miss Universe Puerto Rico 2018 competition at Luis A. Ferré Performing Arts Center in San Juan, where she was crowned as Miss Universe Puerto Rico 2018. She succeeded outgoing Miss Universe Puerto Rico 2017 Danna Hernández. Ortega is also the third woman with noticeably mixed (African and Indigenous) features to win Miss Universe Puerto Rico after Alba Reyes in 2004 and Zuleyka Rivera in 2006. Ortega represented Puerto Rico at Miss Universe 2018 pageant in Bangkok, Thailand, finishing in the Top 5, effectively ending a 4-year drought for Puerto Rico and giving the Island its first top five placement since 2009 when Mayra Matos finished as fourth runner-up.

In 2018 Kiara wore a costume to represent Puerto Rico which featured the Puerto Rican flag colors, three pairs of hands and a star for a headdress.

References

External links 
 Miss Universe Puerto Rico Official Website

Living people
1993 births
Miss Universe 2018 contestants
Puerto Rican beauty pageant winners